The Botanischer Garten Marburg (20 hectares), also known as the Neuer Botanischer Garten Marburg, is a botanical garden maintained by the University of Marburg, located on Karl-von-Frisch-Straße, Marburg, Hesse, Germany, and open daily. An admission fee is charged.

The garden was created between 1961-1977 to replace the Alter Botanischer Garten Marburg, dating from 1810. Its construction involved movement of some 80,000 m³ of earth, creating a pond and a brook about 1 km long, as well as a major effort to build greenhouses. The garden was inaugurated in June 1977 to celebrate the university's 450th anniversary.

Outdoor areas of the garden are organized as follows:

 Alpinum - rock garden representing plants from the high mountains of Europe, western Asia, the Himalayas, Australia, and New Zealand.
 Arboretum - focusing on conifers, including Sequoiadendron giganteum and Metasequoia glyptostroboides, as well as alders, ash, birches, ginkgos, hazels, maples, oaks, deciduous poplars, sycamores, and willows, representing both native and exotic species.
 Burial mounds - Bronze Age graves.
 Fern collection - 80 fern species.
 Forest - spring-blooming plants including Anemone, Gagea, Iris, Narcissus, Pulsatilla, Scilla, and Tulipa.
 Heather and rhododendron garden - numerous heather and rhododendron species including Calluna vulgaris, Erica carnea, Erica cinerea, and Erica tetralix.
 Medicinal and useful plants - including cereals and other carbohydrates, succulents, vegetables, fiber plants, tobacco plants, rubber plants, and dye plants.
 Systematic garden - representatives of seed plant families organized by biological classification

In addition, the garden's greenhouses cover total area of 1,700 square meters as follows: tropical house (545 m², 12 m height); Canary Islands house (182 m² + 82 m², 7 m); tropical crop house (182 m², 7 m) with plants including Ananas comosus and Coffea arabica; Amazon house (123 m², 6 m) containing aquatic plants of the Amazon region including Bruguiera sexangula and Victoria amazonica; tropical fern house (182 m², 7 m); succulent house (227 m², 7 m); Australian outback house (182 m², 7 m); and carnivorous plant house (not open to the public).

See also 

 Alter Botanischer Garten Marburg
 List of botanical gardens in Germany

References 
 Botanischer Garten Marburg
 Horst Becker: Der Alte Botanische Garten in Marburg an der Lahn (Die Blauen Bücher), Königstein 1997, .
 Volker Melzheimer, Hans Christian Weber: Führer durch den Botanischen Garten der Philipps-Universität Marburg, Marburg 1995.
 Marburg. Botanischer Garten der Phillips-Universität in: Loki Schmidt (ed.): Die botanischen Gärten in Deutschland, Hamburg (Hoffmann und Campe) 1997, pages 221-224.
 Rudolf Schmitz: Zur Geschichte des Botanischen Gartens der Philippina in: Deutsche Apotheker-Zeitung, Band 17 (1977), pages 836-842.
 Rudolf Schmitz: Die Naturwissenschaften an der Philipps-Universität Marburg 1527-1977, Marburg 1978.
 Ingeborg Unterhalt-Schüler: Georg Wilhelm Franz Wenderoth (1774–1861). Ein Beitrag zur Geschichte der Botanik an der Universität Marburg, Darmstadt (Hessische Historische Kommission) 1989.

Botanical gardens in Germany
Gardens in Hesse